Josephine Schlanke (born 19 March 1988 in Luckenwalde, Bezirk Potsdam) is a German football defender. She currently plays for 1. FFC Turbine Potsdam II.

Career 
Schlanke began her career at SV 1813 Dennewitz. She joined the academy of 1. FFC Turbine Potsdam in 2002. She won the German girls championship in 2003, 2004 and 2005. Schlanke won the European under 19 championship in 2006.

External links 
 Official homepage of 1. FFC Turbine Potsdam

1988 births
Living people
Sportspeople from Luckenwalde
People from Bezirk Potsdam
German women's footballers
1. FFC Turbine Potsdam players
Women's association football defenders
Footballers from Brandenburg
20th-century German women